USS LST-119 was a  built for the U.S. Navy during World War II. She was designed to carry troops and military equipment to the shores of the battle front and quickly deliver her cargo. She served in the Pacific Ocean and post-war returned home with two battle stars to her credit.

LST-119 was laid down on 12 May 1943 at Jeffersonville, Indiana, by the Jeffersonville Boat & Machine Co.; launched on 28 July 1943; sponsored by Mrs. Gilbert Coughlin; and commissioned on 1 September 1943.

World War II Pacific Theatre operations  
During World War II, LST-119 was assigned to the Asiatic-Pacific theater and participated in the following operations:
 Marshall Islands operation: Occupation of Kwajalein and Majuro Atolls, January and February 1944.
 Marianas operation: Capture and occupation of Saipan, June and July 1944.

Decommissioning  
Upon her return to the United States, LST-119 was decommissioned on 13 May 1946 and struck from the Navy list on 19 June 1946. On 17 May 1948, she was sold to Robert H. Beattie, Oil Transport Co., New Orleans, Louisiana, for  conversion to non-self-propelled operation.

Awards  
LST-119 earned two battle stars for World War II service.

See also 
 Gallant Bess, a film about a horse rescued in World War II in which LST 119 appears.

References

External links 
 NavSource Online: Amphibious Photo Archive - LST-119
 LST 119 website

World War II amphibious warfare vessels of the United States
Ships built in Jeffersonville, Indiana
1943 ships
LST-1-class tank landing ships of the United States Navy